is a union passenger railway station in the city of Matsusaka, Mie Prefecture, operated jointly by Central Japan Railway Company (JR Central) and Kintetsu.

Lines
Matsusaka Station is served by the JR Kisei Main Line and is 34.6 rail kilometers from the terminus of the line at Kameyama Station. It is also a terminus for the 43.5 kilometer JR Meishō Line to Ise-Okitsu Station. The station is also served by the Kintetsu Yamada Line and 8.4 rail kilometers from the terminus of that line at Ise-Nakagawa Station.

Station layout
Matsusaka Station has a total of five platforms serving seven tracks. Of these, the JR portion of the station uses one side platform and two island platforms and the Kintetsu portion has one side platform and one island platform. The platforms are connected footbridges.

Platforms

Adjacent stations

History
Matsusaka Station opened on December 31, 1894 as a station on Sangu Railway Line. The line was nationalized on October 1, 1907, becoming the Sangu Line of the Japanese Government Railways (JGR) on October 12, 1909. On August 17, 1912, the Mie Electric Railway began operations at Matsusaka Station. The Meishō Line began operations from August 25, 1929. On March 27, 1930, Sangu Kyuko Electric Railway Co. connected to Matsusaka Station. A new station building was completed on December 3, 1937. Sangu Kyuko was acquired by Osaka Electric Railway Co. in March 1941, and renamed Kansai Kyuko Railway Co., subsequently merging with the Nankai Railway to form Kintetsu in 1944. The station was transferred to the control of the Japan National Railways (JNR) Kisei Main Line on July 15, 1959. A new station building was completed in November 1962. Mie Electric Railway went out of business in 1964. All freight operations were discontinued in 1984. The station was absorbed into the JR Central network upon the privatization of the JNR on April 1, 1987.

Passenger statistics
In fiscal 2019, the JR portion of the station was used by an average of 1,702 passengers daily (boarding passengers only) and the Kintetsu portion of the station was used by an average of 7,533 passengers daily (boarding passengers only).

Surrounding area
Matsusaka City Hall
Matsusaka Park (former site of Matsusaka Castle)
Matsusaka Technical High School

See also
 List of railway stations in Japan

References

External links

 JR Central: Matsusaka Station
Kintetsu: Matsusaka Station 

Railway stations in Japan opened in 1893
Railway stations in Mie Prefecture
Matsusaka, Mie